The 1999 Swisscom Challenge was a WTA tennis tournament, played on indoor hard courts.

Players

Seeds

Qualifiers

Lucky loser
  Henrieta Nagyová

Qualifying draw

First qualifier

Second qualifier

Third qualifier

Fourth qualifier

External links
 1999 Zurich Open Singles Qualifying Draw

Zurich Open
1999 WTA Tour